Deanne Wilson (born April 30, 1955) is an American athlete. She competed in the women's high jump at the 1972 Summer Olympics.

References

External links
 

1955 births
Living people
Athletes (track and field) at the 1972 Summer Olympics
American female high jumpers
Olympic track and field athletes of the United States
Place of birth missing (living people)
21st-century American women